Oakland is one of five primary historic neighborhoods of the city of Taunton, Massachusetts. Although these neighborhoods are not census-designated areas, they are municipally designated populated regions of the city.

Location 
Oakland Village is located in the northwestern section of the City of Taunton. The village center is located at the intersection of Tremont Street, Worcester Street and North Walker Street. The Oakland neighborhood is bordered on the east by the neighborhood of North Taunton and Whittenton and the Oakland neighborhood is bordered on the west by the neighborhood of Westville. The Oakland neighborhood is bordered on the north west by the communities of Norton, Massachusetts. The main roadway through the neighborhood of Oakland is Tremont Street which was formerly called the Bristol Path. The road was a major stage route to what is today Bristol Rhode Island. Also, Worcester Street was the major stagecoach route to the town of Worcester, Massachusetts.

The original schoolhouse in Oakland still exists at # 4 north Walker Street. The former schoolhouse was later used as a firehouse and is today used by the Lion's Club. The second Oakland School closed in 1954 and is currently an apartment house. The Oakland Cemetery is located on Glebe Street. Other cemeteries include the St Francis Catholic Cemetery is located on Glebe Street as is the Mt Nebo Jewish Cemetery. Th old St Thomas Church Cemetery is located on Tremont Street opposite Tremont Avenue. other cemeteries include the Woodward cemetery in Mello Drive; the Knapp Cemetery on Segregansett Road; the Willis Cemetery on Worcester Street; the Quaker Burying Ground on South Crane Ave; the Bassett Cemetery on South Crane Ave; the thayer Family Cemetery on South Crane Avenue; the Lincoln Cemetery on Davis Street; the Peddy Knapp Cemetery on Burt Street; the Walker Cemetery on Laneway Farm Road.

The Benjamin Friedman Middle School and the Joseph Chamberlain Elementary School are located on Norton Avenue. The Taunton Nursing Home is located on Norton Avenue in the village of Oakland. The Taunton Western Little league Complex is also located on Norton Avenue.

Geography 
Most of Oakland is composed of much heavily wooded areas, swamps, small bodies of water, and enjoys rural residential characteristics with large spacious lots. There are few farms and businesses located within the neighborhood. The major waterway in the neighborhood is the Three Mile River that begins in Norton and travels through Oakland and into the neighboring Westville section of Taunton. The Three Mile River was once called the Nistoquohonock River by the Native Americans.

Transportation 
Route 140 is the only major route within the Oakland neighborhood. The Greater Attleboro Taunton Regional Transit Authority (GATRA) is the only public transportation within the neighborhood, which they operate through Tremont Street/Route 140 and into the town of Norton.

Location 
Oakland consist of a suburban lifestyle, with several small farms far down Tremont Street, after separating from Route 140. Tremont Street is the largest, busiest, and most extensive road in Oakland. Tremont Street is Route 140 for along most of its way through Oakland before separating at the Tremont Street/Alfred Lord Boulevard split. Route 140 runs through the center of the neighborhood and into the town of Norton, making that area the most heavily populated within the neighborhood. Tremont Street into the town of Rehoboth.

The center of the village of Oakland is located at the junction of Tremont Street, Worcester Street and North Walker Street. It is one of the oldest neighborhoods in Taunton. Tremont Street was once the stage route to the town of Bristol. The discovery of iron along Trap Brook off North Walker Street by Nathaniel Burt in 1690 drew many citizens to the region. The oldest home in the city of Taunton is located in the Oakland neighborhood at 28 Worcester Street where Joseph Willis built his saltbox style home in 1688. The home is now owned by Fernandes & Maria Lopes. Woodward Spring Park is located along the Three Mile River at the intersection of Harvey Street and Norton Avenue. Woodward Spring Park was established in 1809 as a passive recreational area for local residents. the park became publicly owned in 1881 when the park was left to the city by industrialist Stimpson Woodward.
The entrance of Oakland begins on Tremont Street at the Rockyknoll Mobile Home Park. The streets in the neighborhood include Tremont, North Walker, Burt, Round, Worcester, Harvey, davis, Glebe and Shorts Streets along with Norton and Crane Avenues.

Education 
The Benjamin Friedman School on Norton Avenue is the only middle school in Oakland and the Edmund Hatch Bennett School on North Walker Street and the Joseph Chamberlain School on Norton Avenue are the only two elementary schools located in Oakland.

Infrastructure 
There are no police stations and/or substations located in the neighborhood, but there is a firehouse and engine for the Oakland area located on North Walker Street.

See also 
 Bristol County
 Greater Taunton Area

Neighborhoods in Massachusetts
Taunton, Massachusetts
Populated places in Bristol County, Massachusetts